The Atlas Motor Buggy was a prototype highwheeler produced by the Atlas Motor Buggy firm of Indianapolis in 1909.  After the sole prototype was built, the firm returned to its two-stroke gasoline and diesel stationary engine production.  Later, the Atlas factory was used for the Lyons-Knight, after the Lyons brothers bought the company.

Notes

References
G.N. Georgano, Nick (Ed.). The Beaulieu Encyclopedia of the Automobile. Chicago: Fitzroy Dearborn, 2000. 
Kimes, Beverly Rae and Clark Jr, Henry Austin.  Standard Catalog of American Cars: 1805–1942 (Third Edition). Iola, WI: Krause. 1996. 

Defunct motor vehicle manufacturers of the United States
Motor vehicle manufacturers based in Indiana
Defunct manufacturing companies based in Indiana